Parectopa oxysphena is a moth of the family Gracillariidae. It is known from Maharashtra, India.

The larvae feed on Flemingia strobilifera. They probably mine the leaves of their host plant.

References

Gracillariinae
Moths of Asia